Hurricane Katrina was a late-forming tropical cyclone that impacted portions of the Greater Antilles and Bahamas in November 1981. The twenty-first tropical cyclone, eleventh named storm, and seventh hurricane of the 1981 Atlantic hurricane season, Katrina developed from an area of cloudiness in the western Caribbean Sea early on November 3. The initial tropical depression deepened slowly, and was upgraded to Tropical Storm Katrina on November 5. About six hours later, Katrina peaked with sustained winds of 85 mph (140 km/h). The storm made landfall along the south coast of Camagüey Province in Cuba early on November 6. Katrina quickly weakened to a tropical storm, before emerging into the Atlantic Ocean hours later. The system then accelerated northeastward and crossed the Bahamas late on November 6. Katrina dissipated late on November 7, shortly before merging with a frontal system.

On Grand Cayman, a waterspout ripped out a grape tree and slammed it into the Brac Reef Hotel's bar. As a result, Cuba experienced flash flooding in mountainous areas as Katrina moved across the country. In southern Camagüey Province, several bridges and railroads were reportedly washed out. Two sugar mills suffered damage. An estimated 4,641 homes suffered impact, 39 of which were destroyed. In addition, approximately 80% of sugar cane crops were damaged. Two people drowned in Cuba while attempting to cross a swollen river in Camagüey Province. The Bahamas received up to 14 in (360 mm) of rain, causing flood damage to watermelon, tomato and corn crops, particularly on Long Island.

Meteorological history

On November 1, an area of disturbed weather – a mass of cloudiness and thunderstorms – developed over the western Caribbean Sea. Subsequently, a low pressure area began to form. In the initial advisory, it was noted that the depression would slowly strengthen, but reach tropical storm status within 24 hours due to "strong" convection. The depression remained disorganized through early on November 4, with satellite imagery and weather stations in the Caribbean Sea region indicating no intensification. However, only a few hours later, the depression strengthened into Tropical Storm Katrina, while drifting northward.

Continuing to strengthen, Katrina slowly recurved north-northeastward and eventually to the northeast. The National Hurricane Center operationally classified Katrina as a tropical depression until  on November 4, after a reconnaissance aircraft flight reported tropical storm force winds. At  on November 5, the storm strengthened into a Category 1 hurricane on the Saffir–Simpson hurricane wind scale. However, Katrina weakened slightly while approaching Cuba. Early on November 6, the storm made landfall in Camagüey Province with winds of 75 mph (120 km/h). Shortly after moving inland, the system weakened to a tropical storm. A deepening trough offshore the East Coast of the United States caused Katrina to accelerate east-northeastward. By  on November 6, the storm emerged into the Atlantic Ocean. Katrina slowly weakened while crossing through the central Bahamas later that day.

Preparations and impact

In anticipation of Katrina, 150,000 people and 120,000 head of cattle in central Cuba were evacuated, according to a broadcast by Havana radio. As a result, Cuban Civil Defense officers issued a storm alert for five provinces. A hurricane watch was declared for the central and eastern Bahamas. Along the southeast coast of Florida, small craft were advised to remain close to port. However, the storm was not expected to, and did not, pose a threat to the United States.

In Grand Cayman, a waterspout ripped out a grape tree and slammed it into the Brac Reef Hotel's Bar. As a result, Cuba experienced flash flooding in mountainous areas as Katrina moved across the country. In southern Camagüey Province, a number of bridges and railroads were washed out. Two sugar mills suffered damage. About 4,641 homes suffered impact, 39 of which were destroyed. In addition, an estimated 80% of sugar cane crops were damaged. Two people drowned in Cuba while attempting to cross a swollen river in Camagüey Province. The Bahamas received up to 14 in (360 mm) of rain. Although no deaths or injuries were reported there, heavy rains in the central islands caused flood damage to watermelon, tomato and corn crops on Long Island. Bad weather from Hurricane Katrina caused the cancellation of the 15th running of the Benson and Hedges Gold Cup Race.

See also

Other storms named Katrina
North Atlantic tropical cyclone

References

External links
Storm Wallet of Hurricane Katrina
1981 Monthly Weather Review

1981 Atlantic hurricane season
Category 1 Atlantic hurricanes
Hurricanes in Cuba
Hurricanes in the Bahamas
Hurricanes in the Cayman Islands